A Tramp Shining is the debut album of Richard Harris, released in 1968 by Dunhill Records. The album was written, arranged, and produced by singer-songwriter Jimmy Webb. Although Harris sang several numbers on the soundtrack album to the film musical Camelot the previous year, A Tramp Shining was Harris' first solo album. "MacArthur Park" was one of the biggest singles of that year, reaching number 2 on the Billboard Hot 100 chart in the United States. The album as a whole was also highly successful and was nominated for a Grammy Award for Album of the Year in 1969.

Reception

In his review in AllMusic, Bruce Eder gave the album four out of five stars, calling A Tramp Shining a "great record, even 35 years later, encompassing pop, rock, elements of classical music, and even pop-soul in a body of brilliant, bittersweet romantic songs by Webb, all presented in a consistently affecting and powerful vocal performance by Harris." Eder praised Harris' performance for its "sheer bravado", writing of his rendition of "Didn't We":

Eder was equally impressed with Jimmy Webb's production and arrangements, which he called "some of the lushest ever heard on a pop album of the period." Eder concluded:

Track listing
All songs were written and arranged by Jimmy Webb.

Personnel
 Richard Harris – vocals
 Jimmy Webb – producer, arranger, composer
 William F. Williams – supervision
 Hal Blaine – drums
 Larry Knechtel – keyboards
 Mike Deasy – guitar
 Joe Osborn – bass guitar
 Sid Sharp – string arrangements
 Jules Chaikin – trumpet
 Jimmy Horn – saxophone
 Tommy Tedesco – guitar
Technical
 Armin Steiner – engineer
 Peter Himmelman – London engineer
 Gary Burden – art direction and design
 Henry Diltz – photography
 Patrick Ward – photography

Chart positions

References

Richard Harris albums
1968 debut albums
Dunhill Records albums
Albums produced by Jimmy Webb
Albums arranged by Jimmy Webb
Orchestral pop albums